Current Issues in Comparative Education is an international online, open-access academic journal publishing diverse opinions of academics, practitioners, and students in the field of comparative and international education.  The journal shares its home with the oldest program in comparative education in the US, the Teachers College Comparative and International Education Program, founded in 1898. Established in March 1997 by a group of doctoral students from Teachers College, Columbia University, the journal is dedicated to serve as a platform for debate and discussion of contemporary educational matters worldwide.

References

External links 
 
 Comparative and International Education Society homepage
 Homepage of Education Resources Information Center (ERIC)

Education journals
Publications established in 1997